The .476 Nitro Express, also known as the .476 Westley Richards, is a British  rifle cartridge introduced by Westley Richards around 1907.

Development
The .476 Nitro Express is one of several rounds (including the .500/465 Nitro Express, .470 Nitro Express, .475 Nitro Express, and .475 No. 2 Nitro Express) developed as a replacement for the .450 Nitro Express following the British Army 1907 ban of .450 caliber ammunition into India and the Sudan, all with comparable performance.

Westley Richards created the .476 Nitro Express by necking down the .500 Nitro Express 3".

Use
Available in single-shot and double rifles, it was less popular than the above-mentioned rounds. It is nearly identical in performance to a number of others in the same class.

The .476 is considered adequate for all African and Indian big game, including elephant and rhinoceros. Its ballistics resemble the .458 Winchester Magnum, with a larger diameter bullet; whether this is an advantage remains in dispute.

Commercial rifles are no longer available in .476 Nitro Express except by special order, ammunition is no longer commercially available, and handloading data are scant, the factory load used 75 gr (4.86 g) of cordite under a 520 gr (33.7 g) slug.

See also
List of rifle cartridges
12 mm caliber
Nitro Express

References

Footnotes

Bibliography
 Barnes, Frank C. & Amber, John T., Cartridges of the World, DBI Books, Northfield, 1972, .
 Kynoch Ammunition, Big Game Cartridges, kynochammunition.co.uk.(  2015-01-01), retrieved 30 Dec 14.
 Wieland, Terry, Nitro Express: The Big Bang of the Big Bang(  2015-01-01), retrieved 30 Dec 14.

Pistol and rifle cartridges
British firearm cartridges
Westley Richards cartridges